Rickson Barbosa Sá da Conceição (born 4 March 1998), commonly known as Rickson, is a Brazilian footballer who plays for Atlético Goianiense as a midfielder.

Career statistics

Club

Honours
 Atlético Goianiense
Campeonato Goiano: 2022

References

1998 births
Living people
Footballers from Rio de Janeiro (city)
Brazilian footballers
Association football midfielders
Campeonato Brasileiro Série A players
Campeonato Brasileiro Série B players
Botafogo de Futebol e Regatas players
América Futebol Clube (MG) players
Guarani FC players
Atlético Clube Goianiense players